Twitcher Glacier is a glacier, 4 miles (6 km) long, which flows east from the Salvesen Range to the east coast of South Georgia, immediately south of Herz Glacier and Iris Bay. The glacier was surveyed in 1951-52 by the SGS. Named by the United Kingdom Antarctic Place-Names Committee (UK-APC) for John Montagu, 4th Earl of Sandwich, First Lord of the Admiralty, 1771–82, who was popularly known as "Jemmy Twitcher."

See also
 List of glaciers in the Antarctic
 Glaciology

References

Glaciers of South Georgia